A bio-energy village is a regionally oriented concept for the use of renewable energy sources in rural areas. The system uses biomass from local agriculture and forestry in a biogas powerplant to meet the complete energy requirements of a village, such as electricity and district heating.

These villages tend to be self-powered and independent from external grids, despite being connected to overland grids for feeding surplus energy. The term "bio-energy village" refers to a dependency on fresh biological material as a source of energy only whereas an "ecovillage" includes a variety of networks.

Examples of such villages are Jühnde near Göttingen, Mauenheim near Tuttlingen and Bollewick near Berlin in Germany.

Energy production
Liquid manure, grass, silage and other raw materials from agriculture are fermented in a biological gas facility. The biogas produced fuels a combined heat and power plant (CHP). The heat is distributed via a district heating system while power is fed into a local electricity grid. In winter, additional heat requirements can be supplied by a supplementary heating plant, in which wood chips or straw are burned.

Existing projects

Jühnde

The first bio-energy village in Germany is Jühnde in the district of Göttingen. A project initiated by the Interdisciplinary Centre For Sustainable Development (IZNE) at the University of Göttingen, and completed in January 2006, the project supplies the village with the heat that it requires and produces twice as much electricity as is used. It has been estimated that the participating households save €750 per year in energy costs.

Mauenheim
In Mauenheim, Baden-Württemberg, a bio-energy village has been developed in Immendingen in the district of Tuttlingen, with approximately 400 inhabitants and 148 buildings. The biogas facility and wood chip heating system are supplemented by a solar energy system. The project started operation in 2006. It has been calculated that about 1900 tonnes of CO2 per year will be saved.

Rai Breitenbach
The Breuberger village of Rai Breitenbach in the Odenwald (approximately 890 inhabitants) is in the process of becoming a bio-energy village. At present the project is still in the planning stage. A feasibility study has been completed and a co-operative created to carry out the project, which is expected to be completed in 2008.

Freiamt 
The village Freiamt in the Black Forest with 4300 inhabitants is using all forms of renewable energy. A biogas plant, Solar power, wind and water energy produce about 14 million kwh energy annually, about 3 million more than needed. Around 150 solar collectors are used for water heating.

Considerations

Advantages
 No climatically harmful waste gases are released. The risks and waste disposal problem of nuclear energy are avoided.
 The energy produced is often cheaper for consumers than conventional energy.
 Local resources are used, saving transportation energy costs.
 Energy costs are locally spent, strengthening the local economy and creating jobs.

Disadvantages
 Capital outlays are high.
 The system works only if a large majority of the inhabitants participate, and can be attached to the local heating supply network.
 The gas evolving is not constant in amount, it may differ due to insufficient raw materials.

See also
 Crowdfunding

External links
 Interdisciplinary Centre For Sustainable Development
 Jühnde village web site

Bioenergy Village
Bioenergy Village
Bioenergy Village